Jiang Tingxi (1669–1732), courtesy name Yangsun, was a Chinese painter, and an editor of the encyclopedia Gujin Tushu Jicheng (Complete Collection of Ancient and Modern Writings and Charts).

Jiang was born in Changshu, Jiangsu. Besides the name Yangsun, he was also known by his courtesy name Youjun, as well as the pseudonyms Nansha, Qingtong Jushi, Qiujun, and XiGu.

The 5020-volume state-sponsored encyclopedia Gǔjīn Túshū Jíchéng was published in 1726 and had been compiled by Chen Menglei and Jiang Tingxi during the reigns of the Kangxi and Yongzheng emperors in the Qing dynasty.

As an official painter and grand secretary to the imperial court, Jiang used a wide variety of artistic styles, and focused particularly on paintings of birds and flowers. He was also proficient in calligraphy. His works influenced later court painters, including Yu Sheng, Yu Zhi.

Although better known for his Gujin Tushu Jicheng, Jiang also contributed—along with other scholars—in the compilation of the "Daqing Yitongzhi" ('Gazetteer of the Qing Empire'). This geographical gazetteer was provided with a preface in 1744 (more than a decade after Jiang's death), revised in 1764, and reprinted in 1849.

Apart of cultural activity, as a holder of the jinshi degree Tinxi performed the important duties in the Qing government's Office of Military Finance, on par with Zhang Tingyu (headed by Yinxiang, the Yongzheng Emperor's brother).

See also 

 Chen Menglei
 Zhang Tingyu
 Gujin Tushu Jicheng

Notes

References 
Barnhart, R. M. et al. Three thousand years of Chinese painting. New Haven, Yale University Press. 1997. 
Fairbank, J.K. and S.Y. Teng. "On the Ch'ing Tributary System," Harvard Journal of Asiatic Studies (Volume 6, Number 2, 1941): 135–246.
Nie, Chongzheng, "Jiang Tingxi". Encyclopedia of China, 1st ed.

1669 births
1732 deaths
Painters from Suzhou
Chinese bird artists
Chinese encyclopedists
Grand Councillors of the Qing dynasty
Grand Secretaries of the Qing dynasty
Politicians from Suzhou
Qing dynasty calligraphers
Qing dynasty painters
Qing dynasty politicians from Jiangsu
People from Changshu
Qing dynasty classicists
Writers from Suzhou